Michael Joseph Patrick Kane (born 9 January 1969) is a British Labour Party politician who has been the Member of Parliament (MP) for Wythenshawe and Sale East since February 2014. He won the seat in the 2014 by-election, which was held following the death of Paul Goggins.

Early life
Kane is the son of Joseph and Kathleen (née McGirl) Kane, Irish immigrants who migrated separately to Manchester in 1955.

He attended St Aidan's Primary School in Northern Moor; he moved on to St Paul's RC High School in Newall Green before studying for his A Levels at Loreto College, Hulme, Manchester. He graduated from Manchester Metropolitan University with a BA in Social Sciences in 1997 and a PGCE in 1999.

Career
Kane was a primary school teacher, at Springfield Primary School, Sale, before working in politics. He has self confessed to be a "blairite"

Political career
Kane joined the Labour Party at 18. In 1991 he was elected to Manchester City Council in Northenden ward, gaining his seat from the Conservatives (the sitting councillor stood as an Independent Conservative against her replacement, but Kane had more votes than both put together). He was re-elected in 1995, 1999 and 2003 but lost in 2004 to the Liberal Democrats on new ward boundaries. Kane was appointed Executive Member for Arts and Leisure in 2007.

When his seat came up for re-election in 2008, he was defeated by eight votes, losing to the Liberal Democrat candidate.

Kane backed David Miliband in the 2010 Labour leadership election.

Kane worked behind the scenes for several politicians, including as office manager for Jonathan Reynolds, MP for Stalybridge and Hyde. He was also a parliamentary assistant to Reynolds and James Purnell, the previous MP for Stalybridge and Hyde. He worked for Tameside Council as a Senior Executive Assistant based in the council leader's office. In July 2013 Kane became the acting chief executive of Movement for Change, an organisation set up by David Miliband to run local political campaigns and train organisers.

On 24 January 2014, he was selected as the Labour candidate for the Wythenshawe and Sale East by-election. He was subsequently elected Member of Parliament for Wythenshawe and Sale East with 13,261 votes.

Whilst he did nominate Liz Kendall, he then supported Owen Smith in the failed attempt to replace Jeremy Corbyn in the 2016 Labour Party (UK) leadership election.

In October 2016, Labour leader Jeremy Corbyn appointed Kane to the Shadow Cabinet as Shadow Minister for Education with responsibility for Schools.

Personal life
Kane is married to Sandra Bracegirdle (who is also a councillor in the City of Manchester). He plays a number of wind instruments including the Uilleann pipes, bagpipes and the flute. He is a Manchester City Football Club season ticket holder. In August 2015, Kane won the Northenden boat race.

Kane is a Roman Catholic.

When asked about his favourite book, he replied "There are two. War of the Worlds by HG Wells and The Ragged-Trousered Philanthropists by Robert Tressell."

His favourite subject to teach was creative writing

Political positions and ideology

Religion 
Kane proposed the "Amess Amendment" after the death of Sir David Amess in October 2021, highlighting to parliament that "...Catholics believe that extreme unction helps guide the soul to God after death, so maybe we could come up with an Amess amendment so that no matter where it is, in a care home or at a crime scene, members, or anybody, can receive that sacrament.". Formally, this amendment will ensure access for Catholic priests to administer the last rites, including at crime scenes.

Education 
In February 2017, he posed how education could be improved by making schools more democratic and accountable to parents - "to coin a phrase, we need to give them back some control". When it comes to the administration in education, he added "...we can’t have 24,000 schools run from the Department for Education...the schools commissioner regions are too large. Wilshaw [Sir Michael, the former Ofsted chief inspector] said that politicians should be involved in raising standards in schools. But how can they do that? They have no formal powers...". On the topic of local powers to help the issue, "The new mayors of Greater Manchester, Greater Merseyside, Birmingham, will have no input at all. If the regional schools commissioners came under their remit, then mayors would be directly accountable for helping to raise standards. I see that as a way forward".

When asked about his favourite education secretary, Kane bluntly described why it was David Blunkett: "He went through the system. He went to night school. He got the idea of pulling yourself up by your bootstraps with some support from the state – and he rebuilt schools that were falling down. When I started training, just as Labour came to power, a lot of my practice was holding a bucket under the rainwater coming in through the roof. By the end of that government … we’d rebuilt the school."

Aviation Sector 
With workforce fears growing due to the redundancies of baggage staff after the COVID-19 pandemic, Kane suggested the sector needs more government assistance for bringing people towards the aviation sector, as firefighters were asked to deal with some of the baggage roles “I think the Government needs to look at a specific aviation package to help in its recovery.”. One of the reasons he believes this is that “Aviation has been struggling to recover but the biggest struggle is getting the workforce back as it expands again."

Housing and Property 
Kane believes it is "not good enough" for tenants to "wait months for assessments and for repairs" when they ask housing providers for consideration. Furthermore, Kane believes in abolishing Section 21 with the intended effect of registering landlords and having "minimum standards being committed to law which would give councils stronger powers to act with rogue landlords".

Workers' Rights 
Amidst P&O's controversial sacking of 800 workers, Kane affirmed his support for their "workforce reinstated and legal action taken against P&O", and in addition, for the practice of "fire and rehire" to be outlawed. This practice involves an employer dismissing a worker and rehiring them on new, less-favourable terms and has seen major UK companies use this practice such as Tesco, Weetabix and British Airways.

References

External links 

Article in the Manchester Gazette
 

1969 births
Living people
Alumni of Manchester Metropolitan University
Labour Party (UK) MPs for English constituencies
Politicians from Manchester
UK MPs 2010–2015
UK MPs 2015–2017
UK MPs 2017–2019
UK MPs 2019–present
Councillors in Manchester
English people of Irish descent
English Roman Catholics